Coke Weed is an American psychedelic rock band from Bar Harbor, Maine, United States. Its lineup consists of Nina Donghia (vocals), Milan McAlevey (guitar and vocals), Caleb Davis (guitar), Zach Soares (bass guitar), and Peter Cuffari (drums). Lead vocal duties are shared between Nina and Milan.

The band's unique blend of indie and psychedelic rock is strongly influenced by bands of the 1960s, and described as "slow and dreamy psych-rock."

Origins
After forming The Lil' Fighters with Walter Martin in the late 1990s, McAlevey recorded several albums at The Walkmen’s original Marcata Recording Studio in Harlem. Eventually, he left the band and New York for Maine and teamed up with Donghia in Bar Harbor on Mount Desert Island to form Coke Weed. The band spent late 2010 recording their debut album, Coke Weed Volume One, which was released the following year.

History (2012–present)
Instead of promoting or touring 'Volume One,' the group got back to work recording their sophomore album Nice Dreams, which was released in the Spring of 2012. The band toured the east coast heavily in the Spring and Summer of 2012 supporting The Walkmen and Woods.

The band spent the first half of 2013 playing shows mostly in their home state of Maine and working on their third LP, Back to Soft, which was released in late October 2013. After release, the band hit the road again touring the east coast. Back to Soft was a small breakthrough for the band and was featured in many national media outlets including The A.V. Club, Paste Magazine, Consequence of Sound, NPR Music, and Spin Magazine.

Members
Nina Donghia - vocals
Milan McAlevey - guitar, vocals
Caleb Davis - guitar
Zach Soares - bass
Peter Cuffari - drums

Discography

Studio albums
 Coke Weed Volume One (2011)
 Nice Dreams (2012)
 Back to Soft (2013)

References

External links
 Official website

American psychedelic rock music groups
Indie rock musical groups from Maine
Indie pop groups from Maine
Musical groups from Maine
Rock music groups from Maine
Dream pop musical groups
Neo-psychedelia groups
Musical groups established in 2010
Musical quintets
American space rock musical groups
Bar Harbor, Maine
2010 establishments in Maine